Rate Mahatmaya was a traditional office and title from the Kandian Kingdom which became part of the British colonial administration within the Kandian and central region of Ceylon.

History
Persons were appointed to the title and office by the King during the Kingdom of Kandy, these appointees headed the administration of a large locality known as Korale, which was a division of the province of the Kingdom known as a Dissava and as such he would be subordinate to the local Dissava. There was no time limit for the officer holder as he held the post at the pleasure of the King, which meant throughout his life, if not incurred the displeasure of the King. It was not hereditary, although members of the same family have been appointed. They were members of the Radala Cast, who were referred to as the Chieftains of Kandy by the British. Many were instrumental in the surrender of the Kandian Kingdom to the British.

Following the expansion of British rule into the provinces of the former Kandian Kingdom in 1815, the British retained the office of Rate Mahatmaya appointing Kandians loyal to the British Crown. Following the Uva Rebellion in 1818 and changers to the administrative divisions of the island with the creation of Districts, British Government Agents (GA) took over the duties of the Dissava, with Rate Mahatmaya becoming a subordinate to the local Government Agents and Assistant Government Agents. During the British administration a Rate Mahatmaya would head a revenue district, a Korale and would e the Kandian equivalent to a Mudaliyar in the lower country or the coastal regions. New appointments were stopped in the 1931 after the abolition of the native department, while current holders retained their posts until their retirement while transferable District Revenue Officers were appointed as replacements. The last Rate Mahatmaya to retire was in the late 1950s.

Notable appointees 
 Punchi Banda Nugawela Dissava - Rate Mahatmaya of Sarasiyapattuwa 
 Barnes Ratwatte DissavaSuccessor of S.D.N Mhawalatenne - Rate Mahatmaya of Balangoda 
 William Ellawala - Rate Mahatmaya
 S. N. W. Hulugalle - Rate Mahatmaya
 Maduwanwela Maha Disawe
 P. B. Elangasinha - co-creator of the Sri Lanka Matha
 Wirasinha Mudiyanselage
Kande Walawwe Punchi Bandara
Andrew James Marambe - Rate Mahatmaya

See also
Native headmen of Ceylon
Walauwa
Sri Lankan titles
Sri Lankan honours system

References

External links
A vignette of British Justice in Colonial Ceylon

Officers of the Kingdom of Kandy
Titles in British Ceylon
Defunct government positions in Sri Lanka